Events from the year 1937 in Canada.

Incumbents

Crown 
 Monarch – George VI

Federal government 
 Governor General – John Buchan
 Prime Minister – William Lyon Mackenzie King
 Chief Justice – Lyman Poore Duff (British Columbia)
 Parliament – 18th

Provincial governments

Lieutenant governors 
Lieutenant Governor of Alberta – Philip Primrose (until March 17) then John C. Bowen (from March 23)   
Lieutenant Governor of British Columbia – Eric Hamber
Lieutenant Governor of Manitoba – William Johnston Tupper  
Lieutenant Governor of New Brunswick – Murray MacLaren  
Lieutenant Governor of Nova Scotia – Walter Harold Covert (until April 7) then Robert Irwin 
Lieutenant Governor of Ontario – Herbert Alexander Bruce (until November 23) then Albert Edward Matthews 
Lieutenant Governor of Prince Edward Island – George Des Brisay de Blois 
Lieutenant Governor of Quebec – Esioff-Léon Patenaude 
Lieutenant Governor of Saskatchewan – Archibald Peter McNab

Premiers 
Premier of Alberta – William Aberhart    
Premier of British Columbia – Thomas Dufferin Pattullo 
Premier of Manitoba – John Bracken 
Premier of New Brunswick – Allison Dysart 
Premier of Nova Scotia – Angus Lewis Macdonald
Premier of Ontario – Mitchell Hepburn 
Premier of Prince Edward Island – Thane Campbell  
Premier of Quebec – Maurice Duplessis 
Premier of Saskatchewan – William John Patterson

Territorial governments

Commissioners 
 Controller of Yukon – George A. Jeckell 
 Commissioner of Northwest Territories – Charles Camsell

Events
April 10 – Trans-Canada Airlines, the predecessor of Air Canada, was created as a subsidiary of Canadian National Railway
August 15 – The Rowell-Sirois Commission is formed
September 1 – Regular flights of Trans-Canada Air Lines begin
October 6 – Ontario election: Mitchell Hepburn's Liberals win a second consecutive majority
November 24 – The first Governor General's Awards are given.
First ascent of Mount Lucania (5,226 m), third highest mountain in Canada.

Sport 
April 17 – The Manitoba Junior Hockey League's Winnipeg Monarchs win their second Memorial Cup by defeating the Northern Ontario Hockey Association's  Copper Cliff Redmen 3 games to 1. The deciding Game 4 was played at Maple Leaf Gardens in Toronto
December 11 – Toronto Argonauts win their fourth Grey Cup by defeating the Winnipeg Blue Bombers 4 to 3 in the 25th Grey Cup played at Varsity Stadium in Toronto

Births

January to June
January 5 – Richard Cashin, lawyer, politician and trade union leader
January 21 – Jim Unger, cartoonist (d. 2012)
January 24 – Suzanne Tremblay, politician
January 26 – Maureen Hemphill, politician
January 29 – Frank Iacobucci, jurist and Puisne Justice on the Supreme Court of Canada
January 31 – Andrée Boucher, politician and 39th Mayor of Quebec City (d. 2007)
February 5 – Larry Hillman, ice hockey player and coach (d. 2022)
February 10 – Roy Megarry, publisher
February 26 – Hagood Hardy, composer, pianist and vibraphonist (d. 1997)
March 2 – Joseph B. MacInnis, diver
March 9 
Bernard Landry, lawyer, teacher, politician and 28th Premier of Quebec
 Harry Neale, ice hockey coach and broadcaster
March 10 – Tommy Hunter, country music singer
March 16 – Brian Browne, jazz pianist and composer (d. 2018)
March 26 – James Lee, politician and 28th Premier of Prince Edward Island
March 30 – Maria Rika Maniates, musicologist (d. 2011)
April 13 – Stan Stasiak, pro wrestler
April 29 – Jean Gauthier, ice hockey player (Montreal Canadiens, Philadelphia Flyers, Boston Bruins) (d. 2013)
May 9 – Jim Walding, politician (d. 2007)
May 13 – Roch Carrier, novelist
June 15 – Toby Tarnow, actress

July to December
July 12 – Michel Louvain, singer (d. 2021)
July 30 – John de Chastelain, general, diplomat and Chairman of the Independent International Commission on Decommissioning (in Northern Ireland)
August 2 – Garth Hudson, musician
August 16 – David Anderson, politician and Minister
August 16 – Ian Deans, politician (d. 2016)
August 25 – John G. Bryden, lawyer, public servant, businessman and Senator
September 2 – Len Carlson, voice actor (d. 2006)
September 3 – Gerry Brisson, ice hockey player (d. 2013)
September 5 – John Dahmer, politician (d. 1988)
September 8 – Barbara Frum, radio and television journalist (d. 1992)
September 9 – Jean Augustine, politician
September 12 – George Chuvalo, boxer
September 19 – Neil Gaudry, politician (d. 1999)
September 23 – Jacques Poulin, novelist
September 27 – Guido Basso, jazz musician (d. 2023)
October 19 – Marilyn Bell, long-distance swimmer, first person to swim across Lake Ontario
October 19 – Stanley Faulder, murderer and first Canadian citizen to be executed in the United States since 1952 (d. 1999)
November 4 – Michael Wilson, politician and diplomat (d. 2019)
November 6 – Gerry St. Germain, politician
November 11 – Stephen Lewis, politician, broadcaster and diplomat
November 12
Barbara McDougall, politician and Minister
Glen Shortliffe, Clerk of the Privy Council (d. 2010)
December 4 – Donnelly Rhodes, actor (d. 2018)
December 19 – Wayne Maunder, Canadian-born American actor (d. 2018)

Date unknown
 Élise Paré-Tousignant, music administrator and pedagogue (d. 2018)

Deaths

January to June

January 21 – Marie Prevost, actress (b. 1896)
January 29 – Marc-Aurèle de Foy Suzor-Coté, painter and sculptor (b. 1869)
February 16 – Rodmond Roblin, businessman, politician and 9th Premier of Manitoba (b. 1853)
March 8 – Howie Morenz, ice hockey player (b. 1902)
June 10 – Robert Borden, lawyer, politician and 8th Prime Minister of Canada (b. 1854)

July to December
July 25 – Charles E. Saunders, agronomist (b. 1867)
October 13 – Simon Fraser Tolmie, politician and 21st Premier of British Columbia (b. 1867)
November 21 – Matthew Robert Blake, politician (b. 1876)
December 27 – John Douglas Hazen, politician and 12th Premier of New Brunswick (b. 1860)

See also
 List of Canadian films

Historical documents
With graphic descriptions of slaughter, United Church moderator expresses outrage at atrocities in Spain and China

Peace league calls national congress because "Human life, Liberty, Social Culture and the Arts hang in terrible jeopardy"

Ontario Lieutenant-Governor endorses Youth Crusade for Peace: "Youth of the world should have a decisive voice"

J.W. Dafoe, J.S. Woodsworth, Sidney E. Smith and others lead weekly 1937 radio broadcast discussions on various Canadian defence policies

On committee studying death penalty, MP Agnes Macphail argues criminally insane murderers should suffer death like other killers

Commons debates Trans-Canada Air Lines (when planes went through mountain passes on 16-hour Winnipeg-Vancouver flights)

Call for more British immigrants to allow West "to develop a race of people that is strong, sturdy and self-reliant"

"The danger is that the Chinese or Japanese by inter-marriage would absorb our own race" - race fear in denying vote to "oriental"

Alberta Social Credit government's "accurate news" bill amended in face of "almost[...]Fascism" and "dictatorship" criticism

Britain's debt to Newfoundland, in its history of exploiting and leaving it underdeveloped, balances assuming its liabilities currently

Calling him "sly" and "delightful," newspaper profiles judge representing Canada on Trail, B.C. fumes tribunal

Canadian studying at Harvard writes about friends fighting in Spain and his fervour for communism

Report of cooperative Canadian and U.S. work done on site of Champlain's Habitation of Port Royal in Nova Scotia

Advertisement for Westinghouse World Cruiser Radio - "Tonal Fidelity Reflects the Living Image of Each Broadcast Note"

Two Canadian Pacific Railway dining car menus

References

 
Years of the 20th century in Canada
Canada
1937 in North America
1930s in Canada